Sakane Dam is a gravity dam located in Shimane Prefecture in Japan. The dam is used for irrigation. The catchment area of the dam is 3.9 km2. The dam impounds about 5  ha of land when full and can store 790 thousand cubic meters of water. The construction of the dam was started on 1974 and completed in 1992.

References

Dams in Shimane Prefecture
1992 establishments in Japan